This is a complete bibliography of works by the American space opera author E. E. Smith.

Since his passing in 1965, the works of E.E. Smith are now public domain in countries where the term of copyright lasts 50 years after the death of the author, or less; generally this does not include works first published posthumously. Works first published before 1927 are also public domain in the United States.  Additionally, a number of the author's works have become public domain in the United States due to non-renewal of copyright.

Bibliography

Series

Lensman

 Triplanetary (revised version, Fantasy Press 1948, second chapter "The Fall of Atlantis" later republished as a short story, a.k.a. "Atlantis") Available online 
 First Lensman (Fantasy Press 1950) Available online
 Galactic Patrol (Astounding Stories Sep 1937 – Feb 1938, Fantasy Press 1950)
 Gray Lensman (Astounding Stories Oct 1939 – Jan 1940, Fantasy Press 1951)
 Second Stage Lensmen (Astounding Stories Nov 1941 – Feb 1942, Fantasy Press 1953)
 The Vortex Blaster, also known as Masters of the Vortex (simultaneously published by Fantasy Press and Gnome Press in 1960) 
"The Vortex Blaster", Comet Stories (July 1941) Available online
"Storm Cloud on Deka", Astonishing Stories (June 1942)
"The Vortex Blaster Makes War", Astonishing Stories (Oct 1942)
 Children of the Lens (Astounding Stories Nov 1947 – Feb 1948, Fantasy Press 1954)

Skylark
 The Skylark of Space (written 1915–1920 with Mrs. Lee Hawkins Garby, Amazing Stories Aug–Oct 1928, Buffalo Book Co. 1946. Paperback edition, heavily revised and without the co-author credit, Pyramid Books 1958) Original version available online
 Skylark Three (Amazing Stories Aug–Oct 1930, Fantasy Press 1948) Available online
 Skylark of Valeron (Astounding Stories Aug 1934 – Feb 1935, Fantasy Press 1949)
 Skylark DuQuesne (Worlds of If Jun–Oct 1965, Pyramid Books 1966)

Subspace
 Subspace Explorers (Canaveral Press 1965, Ace 1968) 
 Subspace Encounter (1983)

Non-series novels and collections
 Spacehounds of IPC (Amazing Stories Jul–Sep 1931, Fantasy Press 1947, Ace 1966) Available online
 Triplanetary (original magazine version, Amazing Stories Jan–Apr 1934) Available online
 The Galaxy Primes (Amazing Stories Mar–May 1959, Ace 1965. A severely edited version that Smith was very displeased with) Available online; 
 The Best of E.E. "Doc" Smith (1975)
"To the Far Reaches of Space" (excerpt from The Skylark of Space, 1928)
"Robot Nemesis" (a.k.a. "What a Course!" and "Course Perilous!", Smith's contribution to the multi-authored series Cosmos, 1934)
"Pirates of Space" (excerpt from Triplanetary, 1934)
"The Vortex Blaster" (set in the Lensman universe, 1941)
"Tedric" (1953) Available online
"Lord Tedric" (1954) Available online
"Subspace Survivors" (first two chapters of Subspace Explorers, published as a novella in Astounding July 1960) Available online
"The Imperial Stars" (1964) 
Have Trenchcoat - Will Travel and Others: A Novel of Suspense and Three Short Stories (non-SF, Advent:Publishers 2001) 
Have Trenchcoat—Will Travel
"Motorsickle Cop"
"Nester of the Caramints"
"Full-Time Nurse"

Collaborations
"What a Course!" (a.k.a. "Robot Nemesis", Chapter 13 (Part 14 of 18) of the round robin novel Cosmos, serialized in Science Fiction Digest/Fantasy Magazine July 1933-December 1934)  
"The Challenge From Beyond" (with Stanley G. Weinbaum, Donald Wandrei, Harl Vincent, and Murray Leinster, one of two round robin stories with the same name (one science fiction version and one fantasy version) published in Fantasy Magazine 1935)
Masters of Space (1976) (unfinished work by sci-fi writer and former secretary of The Galactic Roamers fan club E. Everett Evans later revised and completed by Smith) Available online

Works by others based on Smith's fiction
The works below were published under Smith's name after his death.

Family D'Alembert
(by Stephen Goldin — the first novel is an expansion of Smith's novella of the same name)
 Imperial Stars (1976)
 Stranglers' Moon (1976)
 The Clockwork Traitor (1976)
 Getaway World (1977)
 Appointment at Bloodstar, also known as The Bloodstar Conspiracy (1978)
 The Purity Plot (1978)
 Planet of Treachery (1981)
 Eclipsing Binaries (1983)
 The Omicron Invasion (1984)
 Revolt of the Galaxy (1985)

Lord Tedric 
(by Gordon Eklund based on an EES novella)
 Lord Tedric (1978)
 The Space Pirates (1979)
 Black Knight of the Iron Sphere (1979)
 Alien Realms (1980)

Non-fiction
 Some Clays of Idaho, (with Chester Fowler Smith) undergraduate thesis, University of Idaho, 1914.
 The effect of bleaching with oxides of nitrogen upon the baking quality and commercial value of wheat flour, PhD thesis, George Washington University, 1919, approximately 100 pp.
 "A study of some of the chemical changes which occur in oysters during their preparation for market", Bureau of Chemistry, U.S. Department of Agriculture Bulletin 740, 1919, 24 pp.
 "Viscosity and Baking Quality", Cereal Chemistry 2, 178–89, 1925.
 "What Science Fiction Means to Me" (Science Wonder Stories, June 1929) 
 "Report of the Subcommittee on Hydrogen-Ion Concentration with Special Reference to the Effect of Flour Bleach", Cereal Chemistry 9, 424–8, 1932.
 "Catastrophe" (Astounding Science Fiction May 1938).
 Worldcon Guest of Honor Speech, originally presented at Chicon I on September 1, 1940. To be published in Worldcon Guest of Honor Speeches, edited by Mike Resnick and Joe Siclari, ISFiC Press, August 23, 2006.
 "The Epic of Space" in Of Worlds Beyond: The Science of Science Fiction Writing, edited by Lloyd Arthur Eshbach (Fantasy Press 1947; includes a biographical sketch).
 Introduction to Man of Many Minds by E. Everett Evans (Fantasy Press 1953).
 "The People Who Make Other Worlds No. 11: Edward E. Smith" (Other Worlds Science Stories, March 1953)
 "The Origin of Life" (Luna No. 7 1969, Transcript of speech presented at 12th World Science Fiction Convention, California, Sept. 1954)
 "The Logic of the Law" (Trumpet #10, 1969)

Secondary sources

  Contains a biographical sketch on p. 4, which is included in the excerpt at Steve Jackson Games.

 
 Ethan Fleischer Selectively Annotated English Primary Source Bibliography.
 Ethan Fleischer Z9M9Z: A Lensman Website
 Gharlane of Eddore (1998). Lensman FAQ http://www.chronology.org/noframes/lens/.
 Robert A. Heinlein (1979). "Larger Than Life", written for MosCon I, published in 
 .
 
 Sam Moskowitz (1942). "Doughnut Specialist Smith Blasts Vortices in His Spare Time", Astonishing Stories, June 1942, p. 6. Biographical note accompanying "Storm Cloud on Deka", which is inconsistent with other sources. Unsigned; attribution per Ellik, Evans, & Lewis p. 262.
 
 Frederik Pohl (1964). "Ode to a Skylark", If, May 1964. Reprinted in Lucchetti, pp. 11–15.
 (2009) Doc "Skylark" Smith
 
 
   8pp. Reprint of an article in Fantasy Review, 1948. Describes itself as an interview, but is mostly an essay with some extended quotations.
 Verna Smith Trestrail (presumably 1979). MosCon I Keynote Speech, unpublished typewritten notes.
 Harry Warner (1938). Brief biography in Spaceways Volume 1, No. 1.

References

Bibliographies by writer
Bibliographies of American writers
Science fiction bibliographies